Portree is the largest town on, and capital of, the Isle of Skye in the Inner Hebrides of Scotland.  It is the location for the only secondary school on the island, Portree High School. Public transport services are limited to buses. Portree has a harbour, fringed by cliffs, with a pier designed by Thomas Telford.

Attractions in the town include the Aros centre which celebrates the island's Gaelic heritage. Further arts provision is made through arts organisation ATLAS Arts, a Creative Scotland regularly-funded organisation.   The town also serves as a centre for tourists exploring the island.

Around 939 people (37.72% of the population) can speak Scottish Gaelic.

The A855 road leads north out of the town, passing through villages such as Achachork, Staffin and passes the rocky landscape of the Storr before reaching the landslip of the Quiraing.

Etymology
The current name,  translates as 'king's port', possibly from a visit by King James V of Scotland in 1540. However this etymology has been contested, since James did not arrive in peaceful times. The older name appears to have been , meaning 'slope harbour'.

Prior to the 16th century the settlement's name was Kiltaraglen ('the church of St. Talarican') from Gaelic .

Prehistory and archaeology 
Archaeological investigations in advance of construction of a housing development in 2006–2007, by CFA Archaeology, uncovered evidence of occupation of Portree from the Early Bronze Age to the Medieval period (the earliest radiocarbon date was 2570BC and the latest was AD 1400). They also found stone tools that indicated people were in the area in the Early to Mid Neolithic, possibly as far back as the Late Mesolithic.

The archaeologists discovered the remains of timber roundhouses, a circular ditch-defined enclosure, miniature souterrains, probable standing stone sockets and an assortment of pits. While not many artefacts were recovered there was an assemblage of Beaker pottery. This was the first discovery of a site dating from the Later Bronze Age on the Isle of Skye.

The archaeologists also found evidence of the shooting range that was created in the 1800s with the formation of the Rifle Volunteer movement, (set up in 1859 to defend the country against a potential French invasion). The first official unit in Portree was the 8th Inverness-shire Rifle Volunteer Corps, formed in July 1867.

History
In the 1700s, the town was a popular point of departure for Scots sailing to America to escape poverty. This form of use repeated during the famine in the 1840s. Both times, the town was saved by an influx of boats, often going between mainland Scotland and the Outer Hebrides, who used Portree's pier as a rest point. The town also began exporting fish at this time, which contributed greatly to the local economy.

The Royal Hotel is the site of MacNab's Inn, the last meeting place of Flora MacDonald and Bonnie Prince Charlie in 1746.

The town had the last manual telephone exchange in the UK, which closed in 1976.

Tourism

Portree is considered to be among the "20 most beautiful villages in the UK and Ireland" according to Condé Nast Traveler and is visited by many tourists each year.

A report published in mid 2020 indicated that visitors added £211 million in a single year to the Isle of Skye's economy, prior to travel restrictions imposed because of the COVID-19 pandemic. This was expected to decline substantially due to the COVID-19 pandemic. "Skye is highly vulnerable to the downturn in international visitors that will continue for much of 2020 and beyond", Professor John Lennon of Glasgow Caledonian University told a reporter in July 2020.

In 2016, over 150,000 people stopped at the VisitScotland centre in Portree, a 5% increase over 2015. Overcrowding during peak season was a problem, however, before the pandemic, since it is "the busiest place on the island". One news item recommended that some tourists might prefer accommodations in quieter areas such as Dunvegan, Kyleakin and the Broadford and Breakish area.

The 2020 reports did not cover tourism in Portree specifically but a December 2018 report by well-known travel writer Rick Steves had recommended the village as "Skye’s best home base" for visitors. He indicated that Portree "provided a few hotels, hostels and bed-and-breakfasts in town, while more B&Bs line the roads into and out of town". The tourism bureau added that visitors would appreciate the "banks, churches, cafes and restaurants, a cinema at the Aros Centre, a swimming pool and library, (...) petrol filling stations and supermarkets".

Sport 
The town plays host to the Isle of Skye's shinty club, Skye Camanachd. They play at Pairc nan Laoch above the town on the road to Struan.

Portree is home to two football clubs that play in the Skye and Lochalsh amateur football league called Portree and Portree Juniors.

Portree is now home to a new youth football club, Skye Young Boys.

Climate

Like most of the British Isles, Portree has an oceanic climate (Köppen: Cfb).

Portree shale
Portree shale is a geologic association in the vicinity of Portree, the existence of which is linked with potential petroleum occurrences of commercial importance.

In fiction
'The Portree Kid' was an amusing ballad sung by the Corries.
Portree is the home of a fictional professional Quidditch team in the Harry Potter universe called the 'Pride of Portree'.
The film Made of Honor partially takes place in Portree. A sweeping shot of the town's main street is shown.

References

 
Towns in Highland (council area)
Populated places in the Isle of Skye
Fishing communities in Scotland
Geological type localities
Civil parishes of Scotland
Populated coastal places in Scotland